Hamish Harding (born 15 June 1999) is an Australian representative rower. He has represented at senior World Championships.

Club and state rowing
Harding was raised in Canberra. He is the son of Australia's first female World Champion rower Adair Ferguson. Harding's senior club rowing has been from the Australian National University Boat Club.

International representative rowing
In March 2022 Harding was selected in the Australian senior training team to prepare for the 2022 international season and the 2022 World Rowing Championships.  He competed in Australia's lightweight men's single scull at both World Rowing Cups in June and July 2022.  His World Championship debut was at the 2022 World Rowing Championships at Racize, where he was Australia's representative lightweight single sculler. He made the B final and finished in overall ninth place.

References

External links
Harding at World Rowing

1997 births
Living people
Australian male rowers